"When the Bartender Cries" is a song co-written and recorded by American country music artist Michael Peterson.  It was released in June 1998 as the fourth single from the album Michael Peterson.  The song reached #37 on the Billboard Hot Country Singles & Tracks chart.  The song was written by Peterson and Hunter Davis.

Chart performance

References

1998 singles
1997 songs
Michael Peterson (singer) songs
Songs written by Michael Peterson (singer)
Song recordings produced by Josh Leo
Reprise Records singles